North Central Bengali or Varendrī Bengali  is a dialect of the Bengali language, spoken in the Varendra region (primarily consisting of the Rajshahi Division in Bangladesh and the Malda division in India). Varendri dialect was classified by many renowned Indian linguists like Suniti Kumar Chatterji, Sukumar Sen and others. It is also spoken in adjoining villages in neighbouring Bihar and Jharkhand. Varendri dialect has some influences of neighbouring dialects of Maithili and other Bihari languages.

Comparison
Varendri Bengali is a  Bengali dialect belonging to North Bengal. The standardised register of Bengali was chosen to be the dialect spoken in Nadia (West-Central Bengal).

Examples:
English: A man had two sons.
Standard Bengali: একজন লোকের/মানুষের দুটি ছেলে ছিলো (ækjon loker/manusher duţi chhele chhilo)

Dinajpur: ækzôn mansher duikhona bæt̹a/sawal asilo (P)

Sirajganj : ækzon mainsher duido bæt̹a sol asilo. (P)

Pabna (Women's dialect): ækzôn mansher duid̹a bæt̹a/sawal asilo. (P)

Bogra: ækzon mansher duikona bæt̹a/sol~sawal asilo. (P)

Malda: ækjhon manuser duiţa bæţa/chhawal achhilô. (P)

Rangpur: ækzon mansher duikna/duikhona bæţa/sawal asilo. (P)

Rajshahi: ækzon mansher duid̹a  bæt̹a/sawal asilo. (P)

East Purnia (Siripuria): ækjhonar dui chhawal chhil. (P)

English: (First person) will eat
Standard Bengali: খাবো (khabo)
Eastern Bengali:  খামু (khamu); খাইমু (khaimu); খাম (kham)
Varendri Bengali: খামোঁ (khamõ); খাইমোঁ (khaimõ); খাইম (khaim)
English: Money
Standard Bengali: টাকা (taka)
Varendri Bengali: টেকা (tæka)

In popular culture
Gambhira, a Bengali folk genre is originally evolved with this dialect. This dialect is famous in many Bengali dramas. A web series by Chorki named Shaaticup is created in this dialect.

References

Bengali language
Bengali dialects
Languages of West Bengal
Languages of Bangladesh